Francheville is a commune in the Metropolis of Lyon, region of Auvergne-Rhône-Alpes, eastern France.

Geography
Francheville is a western suburb of Lyon.

Surrounding communes
In the Metropolis of Lyon:
Craponne
Lyon
Sainte-Foy-lès-Lyon
Tassin-la-Demi-Lune
In the Rhône department:
Brindas
Chaponost

Transport

Several buses from the center of Lyon : Lines 14, 29, 30, C2O

Population

City partnerships
Hanau, 
Loano,

Sites of interest
 Château de Francheville, listed as a monument historique.
Fort du Bruissin, an old military fort

References

External links

 Official site

Communes of Lyon Metropolis
Lyonnais